Daniel Zítka (born 20 June 1975) is a Czech former professional footballer who played as a goalkeeper. He played three matches for the Czech Republic. He worked as a goalkeeper coach for AC Sparta Prague.

Career
Zítka began his career at FK Havířov and in 1994 moved to FK Viktoria Žižkov where he accumulated only one league start. He played in the first round of the 1994–95 UEFA Cup Winners' Cup against Chelsea, conceding four goals in a 4–2 first leg defeat in London. The following year, he signed with FC Zlín and in November 1997 transferred to Tatran Prešov in Slovakia.

Two years later, Zítka moved to Belgium, to K.S.C. Lokeren OV. From Öokeren he was recruited by R.S.C. Anderlecht scouts in 2002. Following his arrival at Anderlecht, he was in competition with Tristan Peersman, Zvonko Milojević, Željko Pavlović, Jan Van Steenberghe and Silvio Proto, but remained a first-team regular

On 3 May 2010, he joined Sparta Prague from Anderlecht on a two-year deal.

Honours 
Anderlecht
 Belgian First Division: 2003–04, 2006–07, 2006–07, 2009–10
 Belgian Cup: 2007–08
 Belgian Supercup : 2006 , 2007

Individual
 Man of the Season (Belgian First Division): 2006–07
 Belgian Professional Goalkeeper of the Year: 2006
 Keeper of the Season: 2006–07

References

External links
 
 Goalkeeper Academy Daniel Zitka

1975 births
Living people
People from Havířov
Czech footballers
Association football goalkeepers
Czech Republic international footballers
Czech Republic under-21 international footballers
UEFA Euro 2008 players
Czech First League players
Belgian Pro League players
FK Viktoria Žižkov players
FC Fastav Zlín players
1. FC Tatran Prešov players
K.S.C. Lokeren Oost-Vlaanderen players
R.S.C. Anderlecht players
AC Sparta Prague players
Czech expatriate footballers
Czech expatriate sportspeople in Belgium
Expatriate footballers in Belgium
Sportspeople from the Moravian-Silesian Region